is a Japanese interpreter and beauty pageant titleholder who was crowned Miss World Japan 2016. She is the second hāfu (multiracial) woman to be Miss Japan after Ariana Miyamoto, who won the Miss Universe Japan title in 2015 and fourth who be turned a contestant after Ariana, Yusuke Fujita (Mister Global Japan 2016) and Yuki Sato (Mister World Japan 2016). Her mother is Japanese.

Personal life
Yoshikawa's mother is Japanese and her father is Bengali Indian. Her great-grandfather Prafulla Chandra Ghosh was a politician and the first Chief Minister of the Indian state of West Bengal.

Yoshikawa was born in Tokyo. From ages 6 to 9, she lived in Sacramento, California. She also lived in Kolkata for one year before returning to Japan. She speaks fluent English, Bengali and Japanese. Before becoming Miss World Japan 2016, she worked as a translator and art therapist and also has a license to train elephants.

In 2020, Yoshikawa launched MUKOOMI, a CBD-based wellness and skincare line.

Miss World Japan 2016
On 6 September 2016, Yoshikawa was crowned as Miss World Japan 2016 (Miss Japan 2016). She competed at Miss World 2016 pageant on December in United States and placed in the top 20.

References

External links

Miss World Japan

1994 births
Living people
Japanese beauty pageant winners
Japanese female models
People from Tokyo
Japanese people of Indian descent
Japanese people of Bengali descent
Japanese expatriates in India
Japanese Hindus
Miss World 2016 delegates